Djerid (also jarid, jered) is a type of throwing spear about 3 ft. long, usually with a wooden haft and small steel head but sometimes all steel used for hunting and warfare. Arab in origin, it was used in Asia Minor, India and Africa; later in Rus' and other eastern Europe, including Poland. Sometimes several weapons were carried in a quiver.

A mounted combat game, the Jarid Bazi, was played by the Biluchis, but here the jarid is described as a long spear.

A similar game, involving the thrown djerid, was observed being played by the Pasha of Jerusalem and his officers and attendants by Lt. William Francis Lynch in the 19th century.

References

Throwing spears